Molecular recognition features (MoRFs) are small (10-70 residues) intrinsically disordered regions in proteins that undergo a disorder-to-order transition upon binding to their partners. MoRFs are implicated in protein-protein interactions, which serve as the initial step in molecular recognition. MoRFs are disordered prior to binding to their partners, whereas they form a common 3D structure after interacting with their partners. As MoRF regions tend to resemble disordered proteins with some characteristics of ordered proteins, they can be classified as existing in an extended semi-disordered state.

Categorization

MoRFs can be separated in 4 categories according to the shape they form once bound to their partners.

The categories are:
 α-MoRFs (when they form alpha-helixes)
 β-MoRFs (when they form beta-sheets)
 irregular-MoRFs (when they don't form any shape)
 complex-MoRFs (combination of the above categories)

MoRF predictors
Determining protein structures experimentally is a very time-consuming and expensive process. Therefore, recent years have seen a focus on computational methods for predicting protein structure and structural characteristics. Some aspects of protein structure, such as secondary structure and intrinsic disorder, have benefited greatly from applications of deep learning on an abundance of annotated data. However, computational prediction of MoRF regions remains a challenging task due to the limited availability of annotated data and the rarity of the MoRF class itself. Most current methods have been trained and benchmarked on the sets released by the authors of MoRFPred in 2012, as well as another set released by the authors of MoRFChibi based on experimentally-annotated MoRF data. The table below, adapted from, details some methods currently available for MoRF prediction (as well as related problems).

Databases

mpMoRFsDB

Mutual Folding Induced by Binding (MFIB) database

References 

Proteins